John Middleton (1578–1623) was an English giant who was born in the village of Hale and is commonly known as the Childe of Hale. He was employed as a bodyguard by the sheriff of Lancashire.

History
Middleton was born in the village of Hale, near Liverpool.

Because of his size the landlord and sheriff of Lancashire, Gilbert Ireland, hired him as a bodyguard. When King James I stopped by in 1617 to knight Ireland he heard about Middleton and invited both of them to the court, which they accepted in 1620. Middleton beat the King's champion in wrestling and in doing so broke the man's thumb. He received £20, a large amount of money in those times. Jealous of his wealth, Middleton's companions mugged him or swindled him out of his money while he was returning to Hale. Middleton died impoverished in 1623. He was buried in the cemetery of  St Mary's Church in Hale. The epitaph reads, "Here lyeth the bodie of John Middleton the Childe of Hale. Nine feet three. Borne 1578 Dyede 1623." He is likely one of the tallest people in history.

Influence
There have been numerous local uses and commemorations of Middleton; a pub in Hale, named The Childe of Hale, bears a copy of the Brasenose College portrait as its sign. In 1996 a large tree trunk opposite the church was carved with representations of John Middleton, Hale Lighthouse and other local symbols. In 2011, because of disease and in the interests of public safety the tree trunk was removed by Halton Borough Council.

Portraits
Brasenose College, Oxford, possesses a life-sized portrait, two smaller paintings and two life-sized representations of his hands. Another life-sized portrait can be seen at Speke Hall in Liverpool, a National Trust property. Although he was said to be , some experts suggested that he was merely , believing his hands were not measured accurately according to records. However, his remains were supposed to be exhumed during the Victorian era but were worked out to about 9'3".

Childe of Hale Trail
Speke Hall, near Hale, incorporates a woodland trail depicting his house, feet, hands and other items.

Gallery

References

External links
"The Childe of Hale" (John Reppion in Fortean Times #187, September 2004)

 
1578 births
1623 deaths
16th-century English people
17th-century English people
English folklore
English male wrestlers
People from Hale, Halton
People with gigantism